Chris Webber (born 1973) is an American former professional basketball player.

Chris Webber may also refer to:

Chris Weber (born 1966), American rock musician
Chris Webber (basketball, born 1972), Canadian basketball player
Chris Webber, a character on Peyton Place from 1966 to 1967

See also
Christopher Webber (born 1953), English actor
Christopher Weber (born 1991), German bobsledder
Christian Weber (disambiguation)